Maurice Simon (19 July 1892 – 24 December 1960) was a Belgian colonial administrator.

Early years

Maurice Simon was born on 19 July 1892 in Saint-Gilles, Belgium.
His education was interrupted by the start of World War I (1914-1918).
He served in the army, and was awarded the Croix de Guerre with palm, the Yser Medal and the Legion of Honour (military title).
After the war he graduated in commercial and consular science.

Colonial career

At the age of 32 Simon became a territorial administrator 1st class in the Basakata territory of Equateur Province in the Belgian Congo.
After seven years he was given charge of the Lac Léopold II District.
In 1931 he was transferred to Ruanda as a deputy resident, at a time when the governor Charles Voisin was preparing to depose the Mwami (King) Musinga.
Simon was involved in the enthronement of the successor Mwami Mutara.
In 1937 he was transferred to Kivu Province, and from there was assigned to Usumbura as provincial commissioner of Ruanda-Urundi.

In 1947 Simon was made governor of Ruanda-Urundi.
He signed various ordinances protecting the forests and wildlife.
The United Nations Trusteeship Council held its third session at Lake Success, New York, from 16 June to 5 August 1948.
It reviewed the Belgian report on Ruanda-Urundi.
Simon attended as Belgium's representative and responded to questions about the report and the administration of the territory.
Simon toured Shangugu in 1949, and noted that the land which should have been developed for coffee plantations was still vacant.
He wrote, 

Simon was succeeded by Léo Pétillon in 1949, and in October 1949 was designated secretary-general of the Belgian Congo, based in Léopoldville.
He died on 24 December 1960 in Uccle, Belgium.
He was Commander of the Order of Leopold II and the Royal Order of the Lion.

Notes

Sources

1892 births
1960 deaths
Colonial governors of Ruanda-Urundi